Zhao Lin (1906–2003) original name Luo Huimin, also known as Luo Xianglin, was a People's Republic of China politician. He was born in Ji'an, Jiangxi. He was Chinese Communist Party Committee Secretary of Jilin. He was a member of the Central Advisory Commission and a delegate to the 5th National People's Congress. He was a member of the 61 Renegades.

1906 births
2003 deaths
61 Renegades
Chinese Communist Party politicians from Jiangxi
Delegates to the 7th National Congress of the Chinese Communist Party
Delegates to the 5th National People's Congress
Members of the Central Advisory Commission
People's Republic of China politicians from Jiangxi
Political office-holders in Jilin
Politicians from Ji'an